Kashtariti (fl. 670s BCE) was a Median chieftain. He is mentioned as "King of the Medes" in an inscription dated 678 BCE. His lands were presumably located along the northeastern border of Assyria. Amongst his possessions was the city of Karkašši. Kashtariti forged an alliance of the Medes with the Cimmerians, Mannaeans, and Scythians against Assyria.

Identification
It has been suggested that Kashtariti can be identified as Median king Phraortes. Some scholars, however, deny such a connection based on historical evidence and linguistic differences in the native Iranian names of the two rulers.

Reign
Assyrian texts mention Kashtariti's incursions into Assyria, then under leadership of Esarhaddon. Oracles were commonly sought by Assyrian rulers for such occasions, invoking the gods to assess the situation and guide them towards help. Esarhaddon was no stranger to such practice, frequently turning to these oracles for advice. Before decisions could be made by these oracles, animals would be sacrificed and omens would then be interpreted based on the positions of the carcasses. Decisions would then be made based on these omens. In this instance, Esarhaddon turned to a priest of the sun god, Shamash, for guidance. Tablets dating from the 7th-century BCE, mostly found in Nineveh, describe multiple "oracle requests" in relation to Kashtariti in particular. Among the questions raised to Shamash during these oracle requests were whether Kashtariti was a threat to the Assyrians, and whether he would conquer several Assyrian cities. Kashtariti had asked another Median chieftain, Mamitiarshu, for assistance in attacking the Assyrian city of Kishsassu. One recorded oracle request purports that Esarhaddon feared the loss of the city to the Medians. Kashtariti also planned a raid on the Assyrian town of Kilmân with the Mannaeans and Saparda.

It is clear that Kashtariti's incursions were not a sole occurrence as Esarhaddon had constantly sought oracles to help deal with his bothersome campaign into Assyrian territories. One oracle request suggests that Kashtariti attempted to make peace with the Assyrians. He sent a messenger to the Assyrian royal court, in the hopes of creating a treaty. Esarhaddon pleaded to Shamash, asking whether he should agree to the peace or interrogate the messenger and kill him. A subsequent oracle request suggests that peace was never achieved. Instead, the Assyrians possibly mounted a retaliation against Kashtariti and his forces, with the intention of finally ending attacks from Kashtariti. Kashtariti's alliance was divided due to internal disagreements, and Kashtariti's campaign in Assyria ended before 673 BCE. Some Scythian tribes continued attacks into Assyria. Other Scythian tribes, under the leadership of Bartatua, sought to marry Esarhaddon's daughter to create an alliance with Esarhaddon as a means to end the hostilities. Other Median tribes in Kashtariti's alliance also settled peace with the Assyrians.

References

Sources

 

 
 

678 BC
7th-century BC rulers in Asia
Median people
7th-century BC Iranian people